Zhongyang County is a county in the west of Shanxi province, China. It is under the administration of the prefecture-level city of Lüliang.

Climate

References

External links
www.xzqh.org 

County-level divisions of Shanxi